Fencing at the 1974 Asian Games was held in Tehran, Iran between 3 and 13 September 1974.

Medalists

Men

Women

Medal table

Participating nations

References 

 New Straits Times, September 7–16, 1974
 The Straits Times, September 7–16, 1974

External links
Asian Games medalists

 
1974 Asian Games events
1974
Asian Games